Luis Fernández, also known as Lucho Fernández or Perla (born 31 December 1984, in Madrid, Spain) is a Spanish actor known for the character of Culebra in the Spanish television series Los protegidos.

Biography 
In 2007, Fernandez was in the chorus for the rapper Darmo and appeared in the rapper's music video for the song Mantenlo Ilegal. After seeing Fernandez in the music video, producers of the television series Los Protegidos offered him the role of Culebra, an orphan. He made his film debut as the character of Chino in 2010's Three Steps Above Heaven. In 2011, he appeared in the horror film XP3D. In 2012, Fernandez played a featured character in the television series Fenómenos. In 2013, he appeared in two films : Afterparty from Miguel Larraya, and Barcelona Summer Night.

Fernandez won the award for Best Upcoming Actor at the 2011 Must awards.

Personal life 
In 2011, he had a relationship with the actress Ana Fernández.
In 2012 Fernandez had a relationship with the actress Ana Maria Polvorosa, whom he met during the filming of the Fenómenos.

Filmography 
Television:

Cinema:

Music Videos:

Awards 
 Revelación Must! del año (2010)
 Neox Fan Awards (2012) - Mejor actor de serie
 Neox Fan Awards (2012) - Mejor beso con Ana Fernández.

References

External links 
 

Spanish male film actors
Male actors from Madrid
Spanish male television actors
1984 births
Living people
21st-century Spanish male actors